The Souvenir is a 2019 drama film written and directed by Joanna Hogg. A semi-autobiographical account of Hogg's experiences at film school, it stars Honor Swinton Byrne, Tom Burke and Tilda Swinton. The Souvenir had its world premiere at the Sundance Film Festival on 17 January 2019, and was released in the US on 17 May 2019 by A24, and in the UK on 30 August 2019, by Curzon Artificial Eye. It received critical acclaim.

A sequel, The Souvenir Part II, was released in 2021.

Plot
Julie, a film student, intends to make a movie about a boy, his mother, and their life in the city of Sunderland. She lives in a Knightsbridge flat with another student and his girlfriend. She meets Anthony, a well-to-do man who works at the Foreign Office, who moves in with her after her flatmate moves out. He leaves a postcard with a picture of the girl in a painting called The Souvenir. He later takes her to the gallery where the painting is hung. Julie says the girl looks sad, while Anthony says she looks determined.

Anthony has to travel to Paris but returns with some lingerie, which he asks Julie to put on. While they are in bed, she notices some needle marks on his arm but doesn't know what they are, and he continues to ask Julie for money regularly. Julie starts to pay for their restaurant bills and is forced to borrow money from her parents.

Julie and Anthony have dinner with two of Anthony's friends, who reveal to Julie during a moment alone that Anthony is a heroin addict. Julie is taken aback but does not mention it to Anthony.

Anthony explains over a meal at Harrods that he has had relationships with three other girls, including trips to Venice with at least one of them, who appears to have committed suicide while on the trip. He invites Julie to go to Venice with him.

One evening, she returns to find that her flat has been broken into, and her valuable jewellery is missing. Later, on their trip to Venice, Anthony admits to doing it but didn't tell her to keep her from feeling bad. Julie becomes upset, but Anthony manages to convince her he had a good reason for doing so even though he doesn't elaborate on it, insinuating it is related to work and not to his heroin habit. Julie starts noticing when Anthony is on heroin, and she attends a self-help group. She starts to confront him sometimes but doubts herself, and he manipulates and gaslights her. She begins to take on the responsibility of his addiction.

Julie returns home one evening to find a strange man in her apartment that Anthony must have let in. She also catches an illness from what she's being exposed to through Anthony. Finally, after finding out he was arrested, Julie asks Anthony to move out.

Julie begins to put herself back together after the breakup, to the happiness of her friends and professors. Anthony's mother continues to call Julie in an attempt to find him.

Anthony shows up again and appears clean long enough for Julie to invite him back in with her. He soon goes through withdrawal in front of her and eventually starts using heroin again. He goes missing and is later found dead, having overdosed in a public toilet at the Wallace Collection.

Cast

Release
The film had its world premiere at the Sundance Film Festival on January 27, 2019. A24 and Curzon Artificial Eye acquired U.S. and U.K. distribution rights to the film, respectively. Focus Features acquired distribution rights for the world excluding North America, the United Kingdom and Taiwan. It was released in the United States on 17 May 2019 by A24, and in the United Kingdom on 30 August 2019. It was released on VOD by Lionsgate Home Entertainment on 30 July 2019.

Reception

Box office
The Souvenir grossed $1 million in the United States and Canada, and $1.1 million in other territories for a worldwide total of $2.1 million.

Critical response
The film received critical acclaim upon its premiere. The website's critics consensus reads "Made by a filmmaker in command of her craft and a star perfectly matched with the material, The Souvenir is a uniquely impactful coming of age drama." On Metacritic, the film has a weighted average score of 91 out of 100, based on 45 critics, indicating "universal acclaim".

Guy Lodge of Variety wrote: "Achingly well-observed in its study of a young artist inspired, derailed and finally strengthened by a toxic relationship, it is at once the coming-of-age story of many women and a specific creative manifesto for one of modern British cinema’s most singular writer-directors."

Sight & Sound named The Souvenir the best film of 2019 after polling an international group of 100 film critics from around the world.

Accolades

Sequel

In May 2019, it was announced a sequel would be produced with Swinton Byrne, Swinton, Ayoade and Labed reprising their roles, with Robert Pattinson joining the cast, although he later dropped out and was later replaced with Charlie Heaton and Harris Dickinson. A24 will distribute. Principal photography began in June 2019.

References

External links
 
 
 
 

2019 films
2010s coming-of-age drama films
2019 independent films
A24 (company) films
American coming-of-age drama films
BBC Film films
British coming-of-age drama films
Films about heroin addiction
Films directed by Joanna Hogg
Films about film directors and producers
Films set in London
Films set in Venice
Films set in the 1980s
Films shot in England
Films shot in Venice
2019 drama films
Sundance Film Festival award winners
2010s English-language films
2010s American films
2010s British films